Dismorphiinae, the mimic sulphurs, is a subfamily of butterflies from the family Pieridae. It consists of about 100 species in seven genera, distributed mainly in the Neotropical region, of which only one species occurs in North America and one genus, Leptidea, is in the Palaeartic region.

Genera 
 Dismorphia Hübner, 1816
 Enantia Hübner, [1819]
 Lieinix Gray, 1832
 Leptidea Billberg, 1820
 Moschoneura Butler, 1870
 Patia Klots, 1933
 Pseudopieris Godman & Salvin, [1890]

External links 

 Dismorphiinae at Tree of Life (with phylogenetic hypothesis)
 Dismorphiinae, at Markku Savela's butterfly website
  Images representing Dismorphiinae at EOL
 Pteron Images of Dismorphiinae, in Japanese but with binomial names.
 Mariposas Mexicanas Images of Mexican Dismorphiinae
 Neotropical Butterflies Gallery
 Learn about butterflies Mimicry by Patia orisse
Julius Röber, in Seitz, A. (1907) The Macrolepidoptera of the World 5: The Macrolepidoptera of the American faunistic region. Pieridae 53-111.read text

 

Pieridae of South America
Taxa named by Ernst Schatz
Butterfly subfamilies